Dudley Baldwin Bonsal (October 6, 1906 – July 22, 1995) was a United States district judge of the United States District Court for the Southern District of New York.

Early life and background 
Bonsal was born in  Bedford, New York, the son of Stephen Bonsal (1865–1951) and Henrietta Morris, Stephen Bonsal was a well-known journalist who served several years in the US diplomatic corps, wrote several books, and won a Pulitzer Prize. The Bonsals descended from English Quakers who participated in founding the colony of Pennsylvania in 1682. Henrietta Morris was a descendant of Gouverneur Morris, a leader in the American Revolution. He had three brothers, including American diplomat Philip Bonsal.

Education and career

Born in Bedford, New York, Bonsal received an Artium Baccalaureus degree from Dartmouth College in 1927 and a Bachelor of Laws from Harvard Law School in 1930. He was in private practice in New York City, New York from 1930 to 1942. He was chief counsel to the Office of the Coordinator of Inter-American Affairs from 1942 to 1945, returning to private practice in New York City from 1945 to 1961, and from 1958 to 1960 served as president of the New York City Bar Association.

Federal judicial service

On October 5, 1961, Bonsal received a recess appointment from President John F. Kennedy to a new seat on the United States District Court for the Southern District of New York created by 75 Stat. 80. He was formally nominated to the same seat by President Kennedy on January 15, 1962. He was confirmed by the United States Senate on March 16, 1962, and received his commission on March 17, 1962. He assumed senior status on December 6, 1976. While in senior status, Bonsal was a judge on the Temporary Emergency Court of Appeals from 1977 to 1987, and on the Foreign Intelligence Surveillance Court from 1981 to 1984. Bonsal remained in senior service until his death on July 22, 1995, in Bedford.

Notes

References

Sources
 

1906 births
1995 deaths
Dartmouth College alumni
Harvard Law School alumni
Judges of the United States District Court for the Southern District of New York
United States district court judges appointed by John F. Kennedy
20th-century American judges
Presidents of the New York City Bar Association
20th-century American lawyers
Judges of the United States Foreign Intelligence Surveillance Court
American people of Powhatan descent